Enema of the State is the third studio album by American rock band Blink-182, released on June 1, 1999, by MCA Records. After a long series of performances at various clubs and festivals and several indie recordings throughout the 1990s, Blink-182 first achieved popularity on the Warped Tour and in Australia following the release of their second album Dude Ranch (1997) and its rock radio hit "Dammit." To record their third album, Blink-182 turned to veteran punk rock producer Jerry Finn, who previously worked on Green Day's breakthrough album Dookie (1994). Enema was the band's first album to feature second drummer Travis Barker, who replaced original drummer Scott Raynor.

The group recorded with Finn over a period of three months at numerous locations, including their hometown of San Diego and in Los Angeles. Finn was key in producing the fast-paced, melodic mixes, creating a pop-punk sound with a more radio-friendly, accessible polish. Lyrically, the album is inspired by adolescent frustration and relationships. Guitarist Tom DeLonge and bassist Mark Hoppus primarily culled stories from friends and autobiographical situations to craft summer-related tracks revolving around breakups, suburban parties and maturity, as well as more offbeat subject matter such as UFO conspiracy theories. The cover artwork for Enema of the State features porn star Janine Lindemulder famously clad in a nurse uniform, and the title is a pun on the term enemy of the state.

Enema of the State was an enormous commercial success, although the band was criticized as synthesized, manufactured pop only remotely resembling punk, and pigeonholed as a joke act due to the puerile slant of its singles and associating music videos. The album sold over 15 million copies worldwide, catapulting the band to become one of the biggest rock bands of the turn of the millennium. "What's My Age Again?", "All the Small Things", and "Adam's Song" became hit singles and MTV staples, generating heavy radio airplay. Enema of the State had an extensive impact on contemporary pop-punk, reinventing it for a new generation and spawning countless tributes and accolades.

Background

By 1997, Blink-182, consisting of Mark Hoppus, Tom DeLonge, and Scott Raynor, began to receive mainstream exposure as their sophomore record, Dude Ranch, shipped gold and the lead single "Dammit" began to be added to rock radio playlists across the country. The band entered an extended period of touring beginning that summer, which included each date of the worldwide 1997 Vans Warped Tour, a lifestyle tour promoting skateboarding and punk rock music. The trio would only return to their home of San Diego, California for days at a time before striking out the next tour. "When we did our longest tour stretch, it was right when I started dating my fiancee," recalled guitarist and vocalist Tom DeLonge in 2001. "We were all new and in love, and I had to leave. It was just, 'Hey, I'll see you in nine months.' It was really hard." Hoppus felt increasingly lonely; while the other members had longtime girlfriends to return home to, Hoppus was single. In addition to the hefty touring schedule, the trio grew tired of other commitments, including interviews and TV appearances due to the success of "Dammit."

Desperate for a break, the overworked band began to argue and tensions formed. Raynor, who was at the center of this drama, had been commenting of his desire to attend college for years, and had been taking homework out with him on tour to try and complete his high school diploma. The tension came to a head in February 1998 as the band embarked on SnoCore, described as "a winter version of the Warped Tour." Sharing the stage with Primus, the band was enjoying more success than ever before, but the drama between the musicians had grown substantially. The band reached a low point when the band engaged in a fight on a Nebraska date after SnoCore's conclusion. Raynor would depart following SnoCore, and the ensemble recruited Travis Barker, drummer for the opening ska punk group The Aquabats, to fill in for Raynor. Barker, who had not had time to prepare or practice with the duo, learned the drum tracks for the 20-song setlist in only 45 minutes before the first show and performed them flawlessly thereafter. "I remember Travis rehearsing backstage for an hour or two, then playing with them during sound-check," said Adam Deibert of the Aquabats. "A few of us were standing behind the stage and vividly remember the feeling of this is the new Blink. We should have looked for a new drummer right then because it was obvious what band he belonged in." Shortly thereafter, the band embarked on a short minitour along the western coast, most notably Southern California, the band's favorite place to play. The tour ended with the band headlining a sold-out show at the Palladium in Hollywood, California, where the band had dreamed of performing for years.  Raynor returned for the band's Palladium performance, but the band became increasingly uneasy and arguments grew worse. To offset personal issues and a "tragic loss," Raynor began to drink heavily and it began to affect the band's performances.

Following a largely successful Australian tour in the spring, Hoppus and DeLonge presented an ultimatum: quit drinking or go to an in-patient rehab. Raynor agreed to both and informed the band of his decision after taking the weekend to mull options. According to Raynor, he was fired through a phone call despite his agreement to rehab. Despite this, he felt no malice toward his former bandmates and later conceded they were "right" to fire him. The band would minimize the impact of the situation in future interviews and remained vague regarding his departure. Initial news reports explained that Raynor had "reportedly returned to school." DeLonge would later explain the drinking problem that led to his expulsion: "One show he dropped his sticks 10 times. It was so disturbing to see someone ruining himself."  The addition of Barker inspired DeLonge and Hoppus to "play better" and keep up with their new member, whom DeLonge called "perfect."

Recording and production

Pre-production

MCA gave the band its first professional recording budget, and Blink-182 began work on Enema of the State in October 1998. The trio had not been in a studio in two years and were anxious to record new material. Blink-182 returned to DML Studios to write new songs, where the band had previously spent time writing songs for their second record, Dude Ranch. The three spent much more time in the studio than on previous records, allowing them to try many different things. Barker would drive down each day from Riverside to take part in the writing process. Very satisfied with the results, the band completed writing in two weeks. Though Barker helped write the songs on Enema of the State, only Hoppus and DeLonge received songwriting credits, as Barker was technically a hired musician, not official band member. Don Lithgow, owner and operator of DML Studios, recalled that the trio's celebrity had increased considerably during the recording process: "[It] was different than their other sessions — girls hanging around outside, calling their friends on cell phones. All the kids wanted autographs. ... They'd unlock the doors and let kids into the studio, which most bands would never do." Due to the success of Dude Ranch, the label and band management had high expectations.

Recording
When the band completed writing and recording demos for the songs, the three headed to Los Angeles to record drum tracks at Chick Corea's Mad Hatter Studios in January 1999. Barker recorded the majority of his drum tracks in eight hours. The recording process for the album was completed over a period of four months, and production was handled at several production facilities in southern California, including Signature Sound and Studio West in San Diego, Big Fish Studios in Encinitas, and Conway Recording Studios and The Bomb Factory in Los Angeles. For Barker, the album was "fueled by black coffee and Marlboro Lights"; he was hopeful for the album as the band were well-rehearsed and no time would be wasted. To record Enema of the State, Blink-182 turned to punk rock producer Jerry Finn, who previously worked on Green Day's breakthrough album, Dookie (1994). Hoppus and DeLonge were impressed with his work when they recorded "Mutt" for its placement on the American Pie soundtrack. Finn was harder on the trio to record better takes, and Hoppus credited Finn with knowing a great deal about punk rock music, but also helping the band establish a more pop-inspired sound. Finn came with an array of amps, effects and equipments; previously the band were forced to rent such equipment. Barker kept attempting to irritate Finn by sneaking in vibraslaps, which Finn hated. In addition, the band had so much fun with Finn that there were days when very little work was accomplished: "Recording can get pretty monotonous, but at least we could laugh with Jerry," recalled Hoppus. "A pretty typical day would involve multiple takes for one part of one song, and then everyone would get naked and jump on Jerry." The band chose "never to work with anyone else again," and Finn would produce their next three releases.

Recording completed in March 1999 and all parties involved were enormously proud of the record. "When it was done, we were so stoked. It was like a masterpiece for our band," remembered DeLonge. "We knew this was going to be the best thing we ever did." Hoppus felt the band achieved the purest, cleanest sound on the record that they had been striving for. Finn felt similarly, proud of his work on the record and believing in retrospect that the album would appeal to the masses. As the album was recorded on analog tape, the trio put enormous trust into Finn to give the record the polished pop sound they wanted, recalled DeLonge in 2012. "The Party Song" was the final song to be completed, and the three were mixing the song coincidentally when lead single "What's My Age Again?" premiered on Los Angeles-based radio station KROQ. In 2013, Hoppus referred to Enema of the State as "the heart of Blink-182's musical sensibilities," singling out "its simplicity, its purity, its singularity of purpose between the three of us." According to Barker, the album's title stemmed from DeLonge, who was worried about his diet at the time and using enemas. It could also be a reference to the 1998 film Enemy of The State, which came out a year before the album.

Post-production
At the end of recording, Finn suggested they utilize keyboardist Roger Joseph Manning, Jr., best known for his work with Beck. Hoppus was initially reluctant, noting that most of the band's fans up to that point were hardcore punk rock fans that might not be receptive to keyboard parts. In the end, the group were open to his inclusion: "They welcomed all my ideas and they were super supportive and that’s why it was so much fun working with them," Manning later remembered. For Tom Lord-Alge, the main mixing engineer on the album, the band had one goal: "Make it sound as aggressive as possible." Lord-Alge's mixes were completed at his space, South Beach Studios, located in Miami, Florida. Lastly, the album was mastered by Brian Gardner at Bernie Grundman Mastering in Hollywood. With a runtime of 35 minutes and 17 seconds, Enema of the State is Blink-182’s shortest album to date.

Musical style and composition
Enema of the State is considered by critics as pop-punk and skate punk. The songs on Enema of the State are fast-paced songs regarding "adolescent aimlessness, broken hearts and general confusion over the care and feeding of girls." Summarizing the album's content, The New York Times called Enema of the State a sampling of "ecstatic, goofy numbers about teenage uselessness, with a smattering of tender introspection." The songs are mainly autobiographical, or are inspired by stories from friends' experiences. Enema of the State largely revolves around age and maturity—"more specifically, their lack of it, their attitude toward their lack of it, or their eventual wide-eyed exploration of it." The band decided to emphasize arrangements, harmonies and melodic ideas rather than the fast-paced nature of Dude Ranch; the change was brought about by the band, rather than the label. Barker hoped to give the songs varying tempos, something missing in the group's prior recordings. "I told Mark and Tom, 'It's going to be repetitive if all our songs have the same punk-rock beat all the time. Why don't we try some different tempos?'" DeLonge noted he was open to his proposals, and responded, "Dude, I just play guitar and write melodies. You own the beats. If you have an idea, that's what you're supposed to do." DeLonge later reflected on his desire for a more "pop" sound:

Songs

"Dumpweed" kicks off the record, and explores sexual frustration. The song is based around the hook "I need a girl that I can train," as in dog training. DeLonge, the song's primary lyricist, explains the song in a 2000 tour booklet: "Girls are so much smarter than guys and can see the future as well as never forget the past. So that leaves the dog as the only thing men are smarter than." The song is a "callow complaint about girls not always doing exactly what you wish they would," and is followed by Hoppus' "Don't Leave Me," a song about a breakup, in irony. Hoppus wrote the song in ten minutes. The guitar swell preceding the second chorus is actually a digital reversal of the delaying guitar preceding it. "Aliens Exist" originates from DeLonge's interest in UFOs and conspiracy theories. "Going Away to College" was written in ten minutes by Hoppus while at home sick on Valentine's Day 1999. While watching the movie Can't Hardly Wait, Hoppus began to think about "how much it sucks when people are in love in high school" and are forced to be separated after graduation by different colleges in different cities. Since it was recorded late in production, the band had to go back to Los Angeles to record Barker's drum track.

The track segues directly into "What's My Age Again?," also penned by Hoppus, who created it partially as a joke to amuse friends. It was originally titled "Peter Pan Complex," referencing the subject matter: one who refuses to grow up. "Dysentery Gary" leads off the second half of the album, and was written by DeLonge about a crush that instead chooses someone else. Left with "nothing better to do," the devastated friend chooses to mock her boyfriend. It was one of the first songs the band wrote with Barker, who incorporated a "Latin groove" into his drumming. "Adam's Song," the piano-laced seventh track of the record, was written primarily based on the loneliness that Hoppus experienced during the unending days of touring the previous year. When Hoppus brought the song to the band, the trio reacted positively but showed reluctance to add it to the record, believing the dark subject matter might off-put listeners. Although usually vocals would take many alternate takes to complete, Hoppus completed the vocal track for "Adam's Song" in a single take. The power pop-inspired "All the Small Things" was composed by DeLonge as both an ode to his girlfriend and one of his favorite bands, the Ramones. During the recording process of Enema of the State, DeLonge came home to find roses at the top of the stairs from his girlfriend, which inspired the line: "She left me roses by the stairs; surprises let me know she cares."

"The Party Song" was inspired by when Hoppus attended a "jock-infested" party at San Diego State University and met some students who thought highly of themselves. Disinterested in the party, he felt he would much rather be at home, which found its way into the song's lyrics. "Mutt" was written by DeLonge for his friend Benji Weatherly and his appearance in the Taylor Steele surf video The Show. An early version of "Mutt," with Scott Raynor behind the drum kit, was recorded with producer Mark Trombino and appears on the film's 1998 soundtrack. The title of "Wendy Clear" comes from Hoppus' boat, named "Wendy," and how boaters end transmissions by letting other boaters know the channel is open for use, or "clear." Hoppus wrote the song while on tour with MxPx about having a crush on "someone that you are not supposed to like." Lastly, "Anthem," the final song on Enema of the State, is about being trapped in the suburbs, longing for freedom and the age of 21. It is based on when DeLonge was in high school and told his peers that his band would be playing at a friend's house. The party was later busted by the police and a "giant fight broke out." Hoppus felt it a perfect summary of the album's themes: "lots of youthful angst, energy, and suburban unrest."

Artwork

The cover artwork features porn star Janine Lindemulder dressed in a nurse uniform, pulling on a rubber glove. The band—semi-nude—appear on the back cover with Lindemulder preparing for some sort of injection. The trio was oblivious to the fact that Lindemulder worked in the porn industry until informed by producer Jerry Finn. The record company had delivered a stack of photos of potential cover girls, and the band members happened to pick Lindemulder. "So it's kind of funny that they've been lumped in with Kid Rock and Limp Bizkit, who play up that kind of pimp lifestyle, because Blink is so not that," remarked Finn. According to Mark Hoppus, they always intended to have a sexy nurse on the cover, and the women considered included models from both Playboy and Janine's employer Vivid Entertainment. David Goldman was the photographer behind the shoot, held March 12, 1999, and did not know the trio before shooting. In 2012, he stated the glove was inspired by the album's working title. "Up until the very last minute, the album was going to be called Turn Your Head and Cough," he said. "And that's why I came up with the idea of the glove. Obviously an enema is not really a glove type of thing. I thought it was a good visual." Lindemulder is also featured in the music videos for "What's My Age Again?" and "Man Overboard."

There are three different versions of the cover art. The first release has a red cross on the nurse's hat and a capital B in the Blink-182 logo. The band preferred the lower-case b in the band name, and the second version features the red cross and a lower-case b. In a Reddit comment on June 2, 2013, Blink-182 bassist Mark Hoppus claimed that the American Red Cross pressured the band to remove the red cross from their artwork, stating that if they did not, they would be in violation of the Geneva Conventions. The band complied and, thus, the third iteration of the album cover features a plain white nurse's hat. This third version is the only version to bear a Parental Advisory label for profane lyrics in "Dumpweed" and "Dysentery Gary." Hoppus said the controversy some had with the cover was exaggerated as "it is just a picture of a girl." Art direction for the album was headed by Tim Stedman, with Stedman and graphic designer Keith Tamashiro designing the package. The album cover has since been called iconic by many publications. In 2015, Billboard ranked the cover among the top 15 "greatest of all-time," calling it "an image that was burned into the mind of every TRL viewer, one that became instantly iconic."

Singles

To promote Enema of the State, MCA Records released three singles in support: "What's My Age Again?," "All the Small Things," and "Adam's Song." The singles were bigger than anyone in the band expected, crossing over into Top 40 radio format and experiencing major commercial success. "What's My Age Again?" became an "airplay phenomenon," achieving mass success on both radio and television. Its television success made it into an MTV staple. It achieved the highest success on Billboard Modern Rock Tracks chart, where it peaked at number two. It registered within the top 20 on UK Singles Chart as well, peaking at number 17. The music video for "What's My Age Again?," directed by Marcos Siega, famously depicted the band running naked through the streets of Los Angeles. A clip of the band streaking opened the 1999 Billboard Awards and the band's affinity for nudity would be referenced in interviews for years to come.

"All the Small Things," released in early 2000, became an even bigger success — it crossed over from alt-rock radio to contemporary hit radio, peaking at number six on Billboard Hot 100 and number one on the Modern Rock Tracks chart. This track stayed at the top of the Modern Rock Tracks chart for eight weeks and remained in the top 10 for 20 weeks. It also peaked at number two on the official UK charts, and within the top ten in Italy, Ireland, Austria, Sweden and Australia. The music video for "All the Small Things" parodies boy bands and contemporary pop videos, and features the trio participating in choreographed dancing and dressing up as members of Backstreet Boys, 98 Degrees, and 'N Sync. "I was a little surprised it went over so well," recalled Marcos Siega, director of the clip, commenting that he felt it would offend viewers of Total Request Live (TRL) and boy band fans. "I think we had the opposite effect. In some ways, I think that video put Blink at that sort of pop level with those other bands. We were making fun of them, but it kind of became [what it was making fun of]." At the 2000 MTV Video Music Awards, it was nominated for Video of the Year and Best Pop Video, and won Best Group Video.

The third and final single, "Adam's Song," performed less substantially than the first two but still managed to peak at number two on Billboard Alternative Songs chart. The band was engulfed in controversy when Greg Barnes, a survivor of the Columbine High School massacre, set "Adam's Song" on repeat on his stereo and committed suicide in May 2000. Hoppus was very upset when he got the call from band manager Rick DeVoe explaining what happened, as he intended the track as an anti-suicide song. Rolling Stone later compared the controversy to that of Ozzy Osbourne's "Suicide Solution." Despite that controversy, it managed to connect deeply with fans of the band, who wrote letters to the band remarking the track saved their lives during difficult situations. The constant airplay of the three videos on MTV and TRL cemented the band's image as video stars, amid a climate of teen pop and boy bands.

Release

By May 1999, the group was nearing platinum status for Dude Ranch and sales targets were higher for Enema of the State. The Los Angeles Times ran a Sunday feature on the band two days prior to release, noting that "The musicians are sanguine about chances to repeat or exceed the sales of Dude Ranch, noting the always-shifting sands of pop culture and that they've already done better than they'd ever anticipated." Momentum began to build when US radio stations received advance copies of Enema of the State. MCA issued Enema of the State on June 1, and the release peaked at number nine on the U.S. Billboard 200. The album chart was gripped by the Backstreet Boys' Millennium, but Enema of the State still managed to move 109,000 units that week. The band was supporting Lagwagon in Europe when MCA executives phoned the trio about rising record sales. Joey Cape, frontman of Lagwagon, remarked that "They were selling, like, 90,000 records a day [...] I was saying things like, 'What are you doing here? Go home! Why do you want to be on tour with Lagwagon right now?" At a show shortly following the release of the album, DeLonge was approached by Noodles from The Offspring to congratulate him. "He looks at me right in the eyes and he goes, 'You're next,'" remembered DeLonge, who blushed and shook off the compliment.

The major-label debut sold strongly and nearly four times as fast as Dude Ranch, and shipped gold to stores, unlike its predecessor, which took seven months to achieve that certification. Enema of the State went platinum in October 1999 and went triple platinum in January 2000; in February 2001, the album was certified five times platinum in the United States by the Recording Industry Association of America. The record performed well in international markets as well. Enema of the State went quadruple platinum in Canada and triple platinum in Australia. It peaked at number seven on the Canadian Albums Chart, but peaked the highest worldwide on the New Zealand Albums Chart (number two), where it was certified double platinum. It was also certified double platinum in Italy, platinum in the United Kingdom, and gold in six other territories (Austria, Germany, Indonesia, Mexico, the Philippines, and Switzerland). In Europe, the album sold over one million copies. To further promote Enema of the State, the trio made a cameo appearance in American Pie, a teen comedy released several weeks following the album release. Hoppus, DeLonge and Barker appear in a scene in which they are interrupted rehearsing to see a webcast on a computer. Music from Enema of the State was also used in the film and on its soundtrack. The cameo appearance was well-received, with New York Nitsuh Abebe commending the common sensibility and humor between the two: "green grass, sun, swimming pools, teen boys obsessed with and mildly terrified by sex, jokes about having sex with things that are not other humans, and a healthy side of toilet-oriented gags."

As of 2014, Enema of the State remains the highest seller in the band's catalogue, moving 4.54 million units to date in the U.S., according to Nielsen SoundScan. Combined sales from international markets estimate the album has sold over 15 million copies worldwide.

Reception

Critical response

The initial critical response to Enema at the time of its release was favorable, though some critics found it juvenile. The New York Times designated the record its 'Album of the Week', while Stephen Thomas Erlewine of AllMusic described it as a "fun record that's better than the average neo-punk release." Rolling Stone Neva Chonin found it "harmless, but still gnarly enough to foment the kind of anti-everything rebellion that spawned rock & roll way back in the day." Billboard Paul Verna called the record "short, to the point, and bristling with attitude," while a Kerrang! critic wrote that the album includes "enough energy, attitude and cracking songs here to ensure that Blink will be remembered for more than just onstage nudity." Stephen Thompson at The A.V. Club found it "hard to hate", writing, "the trio's hooky music [is] as smartly conceived as its lyrics [are] stupid." New Musical Express (NME) was vicious in its assessment, calling the record despicable, "wholly toothless and soulless" and deriding the band as "as bad, as meaningless, as the cock-rockers and hippy wankers punk originally sought to destroy."

In the decades since its debut, Enema of the State has been widely hailed as a pop-punk classic, and one of the genre's defining works. Jeremy Gordon at Pitchfork called the record sensitive and juvenile in equal measure; an "amazingly effective" combo. Jeff Yerger from Stereogum viewed it as a spiritual canon successor to Dookie, calling it "the strongest set of songs [Blink] ever wrote [...] the chemistry between the three members is instantly gratifying." Billboard described the album as a "classic" in a retrospective review, calling it the "catchiest batch of songs the band had ever written," and commending the leap in quality both in production and vocals in comparison to its predecessor. Andy Greene of Rolling Stone dubbed it a "landmark," while Dan Weiss, writing for The Recording Academy, praised its "remarkably clean-sounding guitars, [and] the hyperactive drumming of Barker."

Criticism
The success of the album, as well as its cleaner sound and the group's appearances on MTV, caused many longtime fans to accuse the band of "selling out." Many commentators stated that the band's polished pop sound only remotely resembled punk music. Although the video for "All the Small Things" was filmed as a mockery of boy bands and teen pop, "fame [didn't] discriminate based on origin: soon the group was as famous as those it was parodying." "Blink now had the backing of a major record company ... just like the synthesized pop acts they were spoofing," said British journalist Tim Footman. "In what way were they less 'pop' than Sugar Ray and 98 Degrees?" Matt Diehl, author of the book My So-Called Punk, called the basis for satire thin: "To seasoned ears, Blink-182 sounded and looked just as manufactured as the pop idols they were poking fun at." The band faced a backlash shortly after Enema of the State was released from several punk and emo acts who wished to not be associated with their music.

Tristin Laughter, employee of Bay Area record label Lookout! Records, wrote in an issue of the influential zine Punk Planet that the band would have a genuinely negative impact on punk and accused the band of misogyny. DeLonge responded to the accusations, commenting, "I love all those criticisms, because fuck all those magazines! I hate with a passion Maximumrocknroll and all those zines that think they know what punk is supposed to be. I think it's so much more punk to piss people off than to conform to all those veganistic views." While ska veterans Blue Meanies tried to empathize ("I think they [Blink] are just trying to get in the mindset of a teenager, which means a lot of curiosity about sex,") others, such as John Lydon, frontman of the Sex Pistols and Public Image Ltd, dismissed the band as a "bunch of silly boys ... an imitation of a comedy act."

Legacy
The record proved very influential on the pop-punk genre. With the release of the record, Blink-182 became celebrities and the biggest pop-punk act of the era. The glossy production instantly set Blink-182 apart from the other crossover punk acts, such as Green Day. In 2011, The New York Times credited the record with "[taking] punk's already playful core and [giving] it a shiny, accessible polish," calling it "among the catchiest music of the time." Matt Diehl, author of My So-Called Punk, writes that mainstream acolytes of their sound led to profound effects on the "pop punk" genre, such as the deracination of regional scene identity—due to its wide popularity, pop punk bands became commonplace outside the genre's origins. Jon Blisten of Beats Per Minute writes that "Enema success perpetuated pop-punk's viability on mainstream radio, which is where Blink's progeny — bands like Fall Out Boy, Simple Plan, and New Found Glory — would receive a decent amount of airplay." Rolling Stone Nicole Frehsée wrote that the album influenced emo fans, while MTV News credited the album, alongside the Get Up Kids' Something to Write Home About (1999) as pioneering emo pop, calling them "some of the scene's most influential records."

Enema of the State has been called an accurate representation of middle-class teenage life, especially at the time of its release. Entertainment Weekly called it the "perfect encapsulation of the American adolescent male mind-set circa 1999." Nitsuh Abebe of New York describes the immense popularity of the record with adolescents in an article measuring its influence: "After you figure in singles, videos, CD-R burns, copies on repeat in friends' cars and finished basements, this was apparently enough to create blanket immersion among America's twenty-some million teenagers." Alternative Press has ranked Enema of the State among Jerry Finn's top production work, and UK-based music magazine Rock Sound rated it number 2 on their list of "101 Modern Classics" in 2012, writing, "Enema didn't just bring pop-punk to the masses, it marked a complete shift in how music television, radio and the world at large viewed it." In 2014, Ian Cohen of Pitchfork noted the album's extensive influence: "In a literal sense, many indie bands evolved not from Velvet Underground or Sonic Youth, but Smash, Dookie, or Enema of the State—records that served as beginner's manuals and inspired musicians in great numbers to buy their first guitar." Likewise, Scott Russo of the band Unwritten Law remarked that, following the album's release, he would receive CDs from fans that mimicked the glossy sound the album made famous. "It was revolutionary, it was equally as revolutionary as Green Day when it hit, they just didn't get the credit," Russo remarked in 2009.

In 2014, Alternative Press ran a special in celebration of the album's fifteenth anniversary, which contains reflections from members of bands influenced by the album, including The Maine, The Story So Far, Mayday Parade, and Yellowcard, among others. "When I heard how massive and epic Enema was for the first time, my mind was blown. It definitely made me want to be a better songwriter and make bigger-sounding records," said Ryan Key of Yellowcard. In the article, the magazine credits the album with "single-handedly changed the face of mainstream rock." Property of Zack also gave the album a fifteenth anniversary feature, commenting, "Enema of the State has become the single most important album in our overarching community since its release in 1999. It is more important, to this current generation and the one preceding it, than Dookie, or Smash, or whatever you want to put on that pedestal — and it will likely never give up that spot at the top of the standings."

Accolades

* denotes an unordered list

Touring

With massive radio and video play, Blink-182 played to larger crowds when they began touring in support of Enema of the State. The Loserkids Tour commenced in the autumn of 1999 and was the band's first arena tour. The band was forced to postpone remaining dates of a spring European tour in 2000 when both DeLonge and Barker came down with strep throat. The band played to sold-out audiences and performed worldwide during the summer of 2000 on The Mark, Tom and Travis Show Tour. The tour was staged as a drive-in movie, with a giant retro billboard suspended from the ceiling, and films were projected on the screen behind the band – including vintage gay porn as a joke. The tour was one of the most anticipated rock tours of the season and the band headed out on the road with Bad Religion and Fenix TX. Barker broke one of his fingers during an altercation with two men who kept flirting with his girlfriend in Ohio, and Damon Delapaz, guitarist of Fenix TX, stepped in on drums for Barker. Hoppus recalled an overwhelming emotional feeling when the band sold out the Great Western Forum in Los Angeles.

The band also performed at the Reading and Leeds Festivals in August 2000. To celebrate the success of the tour, the band released a limited edition live album titled The Mark, Tom, and Travis Show (The Enema Strikes Back!), which featured snippets of the band's between-song dialogue. Released in November 2000, the band returned to the studio with Finn to complete a song left off the final track listing of Enema of the State: "Man Overboard." The final tour in support of Enema of the State was the 2001 Honda Civic Tour, for which the band designed a Honda Civic to promote the company.

In 2019, the band (who was then touring with guitarist/vocalist Matt Skiba in place of DeLonge) dedicated part of their tour with rapper Lil Wayne to playing Enema of the State in its entirety to honor the 20th anniversary of its release, which included the first live performances of "Aliens Exist" and "Anthem" since the band's initial breakup in 2005.

Track listing

Original release

Australian tour edition

Personnel
Adapted from Enema of the State liner notes.

Blink-182
 Mark Hoppus – bass guitar, vocals
 Tom DeLonge – guitars, vocals
 Travis Barker – drums, percussion

Additional musicians
 Roger Joseph Manning, Jr. – keyboards on "What's My Age Again?," "Adam's Song," "All the Small Things," "Wendy Clear," and "Anthem"

Artwork
 Tim Stedman – art direction, design
 Keith Tamashiro – design
 David Goldman – photography
 Janine Lindemulder – cover model

Production
 Jerry Finn – production, mixing engineer of "The Party Song" and "Wendy Clear"
 Tom Lord-Alge – mixing engineer
 Sean O'Dwyer – recording engineer
 Darrel Harvey – assistant engineer
 John Nelson – assistant engineer
 Robert Read – assistant engineer
 Mike Fasano – drum technician
 Brian Gardner – mastering engineer

Charts

Weekly charts

Year-end charts

Certifications

See also
 1999 in music
 Pop-punk
 Jerry Finn

Notes

References

Footnotes

Sources

External links

 Enema of the State at YouTube (streamed copy where licensed)
 

Blink-182 albums
MCA Records albums
1999 albums
Albums produced by Jerry Finn